COL20A1 is a collagen gene.

Collagens